The Second Battle of Athenry took place at Athenry in Ireland on 10 August 1316 during the Bruce campaign in Ireland.

Overview

The collective number of both armies are unknown, and can only be estimated. Martyn believes the royal army to have been as much as or more than a thousand, while that of Athenry was probably several hundred less. The list of deceased participants on the Irish side alone indicates that exceptionally high numbers were involved.

Outcome

Unlike the First Battle of Athenry in 1249, no account is given of the battle itself in any surviving account. Even the site of the battle itself is uncertain. 

Rickard de Bermingham and William Liath de Burgh led an Anglo-Irish force to victory. John Clyn states that 
"According to common report a sum of five .... thousand in all [were killed] the number decapitated was one thousand five hundred."

The battle was a devastating defeat for the Connacht Gaels, who were allied with the Scotsman Edward Bruce. Among those killed were kings Fedlim Ó Conchobair and Tadhg Ó Cellaigh King of Uí Maine.

In 2016, Martyn wrote that: 

Though various Uí Chonchobair were Rí Connacht till 1477, prospective recovery of the overkingdom died with Fedlimid at Athenry. The real beneficiaries were among the ostensible losers, the kings of Tuadhmhumha, Uí Maine, and Uí Fhiachrach Muaidhe. Within decades each was successfully reconstituted as independent kingdoms, existing as such for the next two hundred and fifty years. Descendants of their leading lineages survive as titled aristocracy today.

The heads of King Fedlimid of Connacht and King Tadhg of Uí Maine were mounted over the town's main gate. This image remains the coat of arms of Athenry today.

Annalistic accounts

The Annals of Ulster

The Annals of Ulster give the following account (U1313, recte 1316):

The Annals of Loch Cé

After winning the battle of Tóchar-móna-Coinnedha (Templetogher, County Galway), on 25 January,

See also
History of Ireland
Irish battles

References

External links
 http://www.theirishstory.com/2013/02/25/7347/#.WYypqdKGOig
 https://www.youtube.com/watch?v=U04hJWwZfUc

Athenry
Athenry 1316
Athenry 1316
Athenry 1316
1316 in Ireland
Athenry
Athenry
Athenry
Battles involving the Conmaicne Angaile